From 1980 to the present, 81 tropical or subtropical cyclones affected the U.S. state of Texas. According to David Roth of the Weather Prediction Center, a tropical cyclone makes landfall along the coastline about three times every four years, and on any  segment of the coastline a hurricane makes landfall about once every six years.

The most active month is September, with 21 total storms, while no recorded storms have affected Texas during the months of December through May. While the most intense storm in terms of barometric pressure is Hurricane Allen in 1980, Hurricane Harvey in 2017 caused the most fatalities and damages, with $125 billion in Texas. The first storm to impact the state during the period is also Hurricane Allen in August 1980, with the most recent being Hurricane Harvey on August 25, 2017. In terms of wind speed, Hurricane Harvey is the strongest storm to affect the state since 1980, producing maximum sustained winds equivalent to  status on the Saffir–Simpson hurricane scale.

During the 1980s, multiple tropical cyclones affected the state, of which six made landfall as hurricanes; three made landfall as major hurricanes. Hurricane Alicia is the most destructive hurricane of the decade, severely impacting the Greater Houston area. The names of all three major hurricanes that impacted Texas during the 1980s were later retired by the World Meteorological Organization. In contrast to the 1980s, during the 1990s only one hurricane, Hurricane Bret, made landfall on the Texas coast. In the next decade five hurricanes would make landfall on Texas. Hurricane Ike, the second costliest hurricane to impact Texas, made landfall during the decade. Other notable systems include Tropical Storm Allison and Hurricane Rita.

1980–1984

August 10, 1980 – Hurricane Allen makes landfall near Brownsville as a  hurricane. Nearly all structures on South Padre Island are destroyed. At least 12 tornadoes are also reported as a result of Allen. One damages hangars and aircraft at Robert Mueller Municipal Airport, causing $250 million in damages. Two deaths are directly attributed to Allen, both of which are drownings in the Corpus Christi area, with five others indirectly killed. An estimated $600 million in damages are attributed to Allen.
September 5, 1980 – Tropical Storm Danielle makes landfall near Galveston Bay as a weak tropical storm. As it moves inland, it causes severe and widespread flooding across Texas. One person is killed due to rains associated with Danielle.
Coastal flooding also occurs, with the worst being near Galveston. Minimal damage is reported.
Late-August 1981 – Tropical Depression Eight moves ashore northeast Mexico on August 29 and into the United States on August 30. The highest rainfall amount reported is from Cheapside, where  falls in a 24‑hour period ending on the morning of August 31. Five die in the town of Shiner due to the heavy rains. Significant flooding also occurs along the Lavaca, Guadalupe, and Colorado rivers in Texas. Damages from the floods amount to nearly $21 million.
October 13, 1981 – Hurricane Norma makes landfall on the Pacific coast of Mexico, but its remnants produce  of rain near Dallas-Fort Worth, killing five. Multiple tornadoes touch down in six counties in the region, injuring three. Hurricane Norma causes $50 million in damages and kills three people in Texas.
September 11, 1982 – Tropical Storm Chris makes landfall near Sabine Pass.

August 18, 1983 – Hurricane Alicia makes landfall near Galveston as a Category 3 hurricane. Alicia causes $2.6 billion in damage and 13 fatalities, along with an estimated 5,805 residential structures either heavily damaged or destroyed. In advance of Alicia, offshore drilling platforms are evacuated. At one point during the storm, the entire city of Galveston loses power, with 250,000 electricity customers in Houston losing power as well. At the time, Hurricane Alicia is the costliest hurricane to impact Texas, not adjusting for inflation. Alicia also causes 23 tornadoes, concentrated around the Galveston and Tyler areas.
August 28, 1983 – Hurricane Barry, a Category 1, makes landfall just south of Brownsville and forces the evacuation of 4,000 people, but causes minor damage.
Numerous road closures take place due to the floods caused by the remnants of Tico. In Val Verde County, 100 people are evacuated due to the heavy rain. Tico's remnants kill one person and cause $93 million in damages.

1985–1989
October 11, 1985 – The remnants of Hurricane Waldo produce rainfall over most of West Texas, with multiple rain totals of at least .
The rains cause widespread floods that lead to road closures, and gusty winds cause some power outages. Coastal flooding is also reported as a result of high tides caused by Juan.
June 26, 1986 – Hurricane Bonnie makes landfall near High Island in Southeast Texas as a Category 1 hurricane, killing four people in Texas and producing heavy rainfall that causes street flooding. Bonnie also spawns four tornadoes in Texas.
August 6, 1986 – A tropical depression produces rain over South Texas with a maximum total of  near Refugio.
October 22, 1986 – The remnants of Hurricane Roslyn produce rainfall over much of southern and eastern Texas, with the heaviest totals along the middle Texas coast, where rainfall totals exceeds . Roslyn causes low-water crossings and streams to flood.

August 12, 1988 – Tropical Storm Beryl produces heavy rainfall over East Texas. Some areas receive  of rain, causing localized flash flooding.
As a result, beach erosion is reported on Padre Island. Minor wind damage is reported from Gilbert. Twenty-nine tornadoes are recorded across Texas, with the worst damage in San Antonio. Gilbert causes three deaths in Texas, all resulting from tornadoes in San Antonio. Damages from Gilbert total to $50 million.
Late-June 1989 – Tropical Storm Allison makes landfall near Freeport, causing three deaths in the state. Storm surge from the storm measures  in Trinity Bay. As a result, beach erosion is reported on Padre Island. Allison causes an estimated $400 million in Texas alone.
August 1, 1989 – Hurricane Chantal makes landfall as a minimal hurricane at High Island, Texas, causing two deaths from flash flooding.
October 16, 1989 – Hurricane Jerry affects the Galveston area as a minimal hurricane. The storm kills three people when a car is blown off The Galveston seawall. Jerry causes $70 million in damage and kills three.

1990–1994

October 3, 1990 – Tropical Storm Rachel's remnants affect portions of West Texas. Roads in Big Bend National Park are closed due to high water levels.
July 6, 1991 – Tropical Depression Two causes isolated rainfall over Texas, with a maximum total of  reported within the vicinity of Anahuac.
June 20, 1993 – Tropical Storm Arlene makes landfall near Padre Island. Heavy beach erosion occurs as a result of the storm. Arlene causes $55 million in damage and its flooding rains kill one person.
September 14, 1993 – Hurricane Lidia moves into Texas before being absorbed by a cold front near Austin. The combination of the front and the hurricane's remnants trigger tornadoes, and one causes more than $8 million in damages. Five people are injured in Arlington after a roof is torn off their hotel.
Mid-October 1994 – The remnants of Hurricane Rosa cause severe flooding in Texas. The floods kill 22 people and cause $700 million in damages.

1995–1999
July 31, 1995 – Tropical Storm Dean makes landfall near Freeport. The rainfall results in moderate localized damage.
Slight storm surge associated with Gabrielle floods beaches along the southern Texas coast.
September 16, 1995 – Hurricane Ismael's remnants move across the Texas Panhandle.
August 23, 1996 – Hurricane Dolly makes landfall near Tampico, Mexico.
October 4, 1996 – Tropical Storm Josephine forms just offshore of the Texas coast, bringing heavy rain to the state. The storm, although remaining offshore, causes severe beach erosion across much of the coast.
August 23, 1998 – Tropical Storm Charley makes landfall near Port Aransas. Severe inland flooding occurs in Val Verde Country and 13 people are killed. Del Rio records  of rain in 24 hours from the storm, a city record and the most rainfall from a tropical cyclone in Texas since Tropical Storm Claudette in 1979.
September 11, 1998 – Tropical Storm Frances makes landfall north of Corpus Christi on September 11 as a moderately strong tropical storm. As a result of the rains, many rivers and bayous overflow. Frances causes an estimated total of $500 million in property damage.
Mid-October 1998 – Moisture associated with the remnants of Hurricane Madeline results in flooding in Central Texas. The event breaks numerous rain records in the region, including the wettest month for San Antonio since records began in 1885. In addition, 15 rivers exceed the previously known peak flow. The floods kill 31 people. and cause $1.5 billion in damages.
August 23, 1999 – Hurricane Bret makes landfall as a Category 3 hurricane on Padre Island, becoming the first major hurricane to hit Texas since Hurricane Alicia in 1983. As it approaches landfall, large swells cause minor beach erosion along the coast. Along with rainfall from Bret, beaches in Matagorda County are closed due to the high water level. Further inland, heavy rainfall occurs across South Texas, reaching  in Sarita. At the height of the storm, power outages cut electricity to an estimated 64,000 customers. Due to the small size of Bret and its landfall in a relatively unpopulated region of the Texas coast, damages from Bret total just $15 million, but it causes four deaths, all of which are attributed to a semi-trailer truck jackknifing in Laredo.

2000–2004

Minimal damage is reported.
June 5, 2001 – Tropical Storm Allison makes landfall near Freeport. It stalls over eastern Texas for several days, dropping extreme amounts of rain which leads to catastrophic flooding. Allison causes flash flooding in the area, producing widespread street flooding and filling nearby bayous to severe levels. The Texas Medical Center is severely damaged, with losses of up to $2 billion. Patient evacuations and medical services are disrupted due to power outages caused by the storm. Allison causes an estimated $4.8 billion in damages, nearly all of it related to freshwater flooding in the Greater Houston region. Tropical Storm Allison causes 23 deaths in the state, and was the only non-hurricane strength storm to have its name retired until Tropical Storm Erika (did not affect the U.S.) in 2015.
August 9, 2002 – Tropical Storm Bertha makes landfall as a tropical depression near Kingsville, causing isolated rainfall throughout the state.
September 7, 2002 – Tropical Storm Fay makes landfall near Port O'Connor, where it causes heavy rainfall and $450,000 in damage. Fay causes five tornadoes, one of which injures three people. Much of the impact takes place in Brazoria County, where over 2,300 homes are damaged.
June 30, 2003 – Tropical Storm Bill causes minor beach erosion on the Bolivar Peninsula.
Claudette is responsible for one direct death. Inland towns in Texas sustain significant wind damage. Estimated damages total up to $180 million.
August 16, 2003 – Hurricane Erika makes landfall in the Mexican state of Tamaulipas as a minor Category 1 hurricane, causing minor coastal damage and beach erosion in parts of southern Texas.
September 22, 2003 – Hurricane Marty from the East Pacific makes landfall in the Mexican state of Baja California Sur. Rainfall associated with the remnants of Marty affects western Texas.
September 20, 2004 – As the remnants of Hurricane Javier move northeast through northwest Mexico,  of rain is reported in western Texas.
September 24, 2004 – Four days after Hurricane Javier affected the state, Hurricane Ivan, having regenerated into a tropical storm in the Gulf of Mexico, makes landfall near Cameron, Louisiana, as a tropical depression. Over  of rain is dropped on eastern Texas.

2005–2009

July 20, 2005 – Hurricane Emily makes landfall in Tamaulipas, Mexico, providing rainfall to drought-affected areas of southern Texas.
September 23, 2005 – Hurricane Rita makes landfall as a Category 3 hurricane on the border between Louisiana and Texas on September 23. In preparation for its landfall, the largest evacuation in United States history takes place, with over 3 million people evacuating inland. At one point during the storm, 1 million energy customers lose power due to outages. Major flooding is reported in Port Arthur and Beaumont. Offshore oil platforms throughout Rita's path also suffer significant damage, though the refineries of Houston, originally thought to be at risk, escape the brunt of the storm. Many of the indirect deaths linked to Rita are caused by a single bus fire in mass evacuations out of Houston. Rita causes 59 deaths in the state all told.
September 2, 2006 – The remnants of Hurricane John, an East Pacific storm, cause moderate to heavy rainfall.
September 16, 2006 – Hurricane Lane, another East Pacific storm, makes landfall in the Mexican state of Sinaloa.
August 16, 2007 – Tropical Storm Erin makes landfall near Lamar as a minimal tropical storm. Erin causes nine deaths in the state and causes nearly $49 million in damages.
The storm kills one person and leaves $50 million in damage.

July 23, 2008 – Hurricane Dolly makes landfall at South Padre Island with winds near 100 mph. On South Padre Island, moderate structural damage, mostly to roofs, is reported. Tree and utility pole damage is widespread across Cameron County. Widespread power outages are reported across southern Texas as a result of Dolly.
August 5, 2008 – Tropical Storm Edouard makes landfall near Port Arthur with winds near 65 mph. Edouard provides beneficial rain to a drought stricken central Texas.
September 1, 2008 – Hurricane Gustav produces heavy rain to extreme East Texas as it makes landfall in Louisiana as a Category 2 hurricane. The storm causes strong rip currents and minor overwash of the coast.
September 13, 2008 – Hurricane Ike makes landfall at Galveston as a large Category 2 hurricane. Many structures on the Bolivar Peninsula are destroyed. Most notably, in Gilchrist all but one house is destroyed by the storm surge. At one point, the storm knocks out power to as many as an estimated 2.6 million people. Ike is one of the most destructive hurricanes ever to hit Texas and one of the deadliest, causing $19.3 billion in damages and killing 84 people.
October 13, 2008 – Hurricane Norbert causes moderate rainfall over West Texas after moving inland from the eastern Pacific.
November 10, 2009 – Hurricane Ida causes minimal effects on Texas, producing high tides that lead to road closures.

2010–present

June 30, 2010 – Hurricane Alex makes landfall at Soto la Marina, Tamaulipas in Mexico as a large Category 2 hurricane, bringing heavy rains, wind, and tornadoes to South Texas. The hurricane's remnants also bring heavy rains to portions of the Rio Grande, causing it to exceed record levels.
However, there are no reports of significant damage.
September 7, 2010 – Tropical Storm Hermine makes landfall in northeastern Mexico as a strong tropical storm with  winds. In the Rio Grande Valley, an estimated 35,000 homes lose power due to Hermine, while in Bexar County, 100,000 customers lose power. Farm crops in the Texas Coastal Bend are also damaged by the strong winds and rain. In addition, numerous roads are closed due to overwash. Hermine kills five people and causes $240 million in damages in the state.
June 30, 2011 – Tropical Storm Arlene makes landfall south of Texas near Cabo Rojo. The outer bands of Arlene produce  of rain in southern Texas.
July 30, 2011 – Tropical Storm Don makes landfall near Baffin Bay, Texas before quickly dissipating. Cotton farms benefit from the minimal rainfall.
Despite the light rainfall, strong winds further inland help ignite numerous wildfires throughout the state. One of the fires, the Bastrop County Complex fire, destroys 1,700 homes and businesses, becoming the most destructive wildfire in Texas history.
August 31, 2012 – Outer rainbands associated with Hurricane Isaac cause slight rainfall in East Texas, peaking at around  near Galveston Bay. Strong winds associated with Isaac's thunderstorms knock down many trees in Trinity County, where wind gusts peak at an estimated .
September 29, 2012 – Moisture associated with the remnants of Hurricane Miriam and Tropical Storm Norman brings light rainfall over areas of Texas, slightly alleviating drought conditions. Rainfall in the state measures , causing some flash flooding. Combined with a surface trough, the moisture generates severe thunderstorms which later coalesce into a squall line, bringing strong winds which cause numerous reports of window damage.
Mid-September 2013 – As Hurricane Ingrid passes to the south, its outer rainbands drop isolated areas of heavy rainfall across South Texas. Rainfall totals from the bands peak at approximately  near the Texas border with Mexico.
After dissipating, moisture from the remnant system causes additional showers in the area. Urban flooding as a result of poor water drainage occurs in Brownsville, Edinburg, and McAllen. However, the heavy rainfall helps to alleviate some drought conditions in South Texas.
September 20, 2014 – Flooding associated with the remnants of Hurricane Odile kill one sheriff's deputy in Austin.
However, most of Bill's impacts in Texas are associated with heavy rainfall. Several isolated areas receive rainfall in excess of 10 in (25 cm) of rainfall, including a large swath of Victoria County.
October 20–24, 2015 – Hurricane Patricia's remnants bring heavy rain to Texas. The maximum rainfall total is reported to be  in Corsicana. This rain causes the flooding and closure of Interstate 45 in that area.
September 8, 2016 – The remnants of Hurricane Newton bring heavy rains to parts of western Texas, however there are no reports of significant damage.
One fatality takes place in Bolivar Peninsula.
 Late August 2017 – Hurricane Harvey makes landfall on San José Island near Rockport as a Category 4 hurricane on August 26 with sustained winds of 130 mph (215 km/h). The Aransas County Airport in Rockport registers a peak wind gust of  within Harvey's eyewall. Extensive wind damage occurs in Rockport and Fulton, with many roofs blown off and walls torn apart; widespread damage also befalls nearby communities. Weak steering currents cause Harvey to slowly meander along the Texas Coastal Plain for several days, subjecting large swaths of the region to prolonged and torrential rainfall from the storm's rainbands. The unprecedented scale of the rainfall in both extent and magnitude causes catastrophic flooding, displacing approximately 1.8 million people. Bayous in the Greater Houston area rapidly rise and overrun their banks, prompting evacuations and submerging parts of Houston; 60,049 residents are rescued. Parts of all 22 major freeways in the metropolitan area suffer inundation. Tens of thousands of homes in Southeast Texas are inundated by record flooding. In total, Harvey's effects destroy 16,930 homes and damage 290,063 homes. At least 68 deaths are directly attributed to Harvey's forces, making it the deadliest hurricane in Texas since 1919; an additional 35 deaths are indirectly attributed to Harvey. The NOAA estimates a $125 billion damage toll for Harvey, making it the second costliest hurricane in U.S. history when adjusting for inflation and the costliest hurricane in Texas history.
The slow and erratic movement of the tropical cyclone produces widespread and catastrophic flooding across much of southeastern Texas. Imelda's effects kill five people.
Texas incurs over $1.1 billion in damage, sustaining heavy losses to crops in the Rio Grande Valley and widespread power outages affecting some 200,000 people. Five indirect deaths are attributed to the storm, including four from carbon monoxide poisoning in Edinburg. Rainfall totals of  occur across the Rio Grande Valley, punctuated by a peak total of  near Santa Rosa. The heavy rains trigger flash floods and prompt water rescues in Hidalgo and Cameron counties.
August 26, 2020 – the western extent of Hurricane Laura impacts Southeast Texas, bringing  wind gusts and leaving Orange hardest-hit. More than 160,000 energy customers lose power, including about 90 percent of Orange County. Six people die of carbon monoxide poisoning in Laura's aftermath and an additional 18 people are treated for carbon monoxide injuries.
Significant flooding occurs in southern parts of Houston with damage to at least 20–25 homes; one person drowns in Brays Bayou.
Over 500,000 people lose power in the state's affected areas. The damage from Nicholas is most considerable in Brazoria and Matagorda counties. Virtually all homes in Surfside Beach sustain  damage.

Monthly statistics

Deadly storms
The following is a list of tropical storms with known deaths in the state.

See also

Atlantic hurricane season
List of Atlantic hurricanes
List of Pacific hurricanes
List of wettest known tropical cyclones affecting Texas

Notes

References

 List 1980
Texas
Hurricanes (1980-present)